Benjamin Hart (born 19 October 1990) is an English magician. In 2007, he was awarded the "Young Magician of the Year" award by The Magic Circle. Hart has worked on British television and is an inventor and designer of magic tricks and stage illusions. In 2014, he starred in Killer Magic on BBC Three. Hart was a finalist on Britain's Got Talent in 2019.

Television career
In 2014, Hart wrote and starred in Killer Magic on BBC Three which was awarded "Best Non-Competitive Reality Show" at the National Reality Television Awards. In 2016, Hart starred in Ben Hart's Life Hacks on BBC Three the first episode of which was directed by Matt Edmondson, and later Ben Hart's Life Hacks with The Voice which saw him pranking the celebrity judges of The Voice UK, including Boy George, Paloma Faith and Ricky Wilson of the Kaiser Chiefs. Hart also appeared in a regular slot within Now You See It on BBC One hosted by Mel Giedroyc. Other television credits include The Sorcerer's Apprentice for CBBC, Lorraine, The One Show for BBC One where Hart teleported a human to the top of Broadcasting House, Partners in Rhyme hosted by Len Goodman for BBC One, and ASAP, and Umagang Kay Ganda live in the Philippines. He has also presented his favourite music videos on Myx.
For BBC Click and Objective Productions, Hart created the "world's first 360 magic trick" for the Royal Television Society. Hart has also performed his magic live on the radio for BBC Radio One and has created advertising campaigns for Trident, Nicorette, Costa Coffee, and Sky TV. He has appeared multiple times on This Morning (TV programme).

In 2019, Hart auditioned for series thirteen of Britain's Got Talent. His first round aired on 11 May 2019, and he was later selected by the judges as one of the 40 acts to perform in the live semi-finals. On 30 May, he won the public vote at the fourth semi-final and competed in the final against 10 other acts on 2 June. He came in third place on the show. During the judge's feedback, David Walliams described Ben as "the living embodiment of magic".

In September 2019 Hart competed in the second series of BGT: The Champions but was eliminated after one performance. In January 2020 Hart appeared in America's Got Talent: The Champions.

Theatre

Hart has written and performed 5 solo shows, each premiering at the Edinburgh Festival Fringe. He is known for his unusual performance style that mixes unusual, original magic with storytelling and theatricality, his performance style having been described as somewhere between Hannibal Lecter and Tim Burton 
His shows include: 
The Outsider (2013) (directed by Anthony Owen, the executive producer of Derren Brown) which was nominated for the Time Out and Soho Theatre TO&ST cabaret award.
The Vanishing Boy (2014) (co-written by Al Joshua),
Belief? (2017) which was a total sell-out and appeared on The Scotsman's list of top magic shows at the Edinburgh Fringe Festival 2017.
The Nutshell (a highly unusual magic show inspired by the work of Frances Glessner Lee) which was critically acclaimed, running at the Edinburgh Fringe 2018, The Adelaide Fringe Festival 2019 and will return to Edinburgh for 2019.
"Wonder" (2020) A 65 Date UK tour

Since 2015, Hart has performed as part of Impossible produced by Jamie Hendry, playing two seasons at the Noel Coward Theatre in London's West End, Dubai Opera, Singapore, and Smart Araneta Coliseum in the Philippines. He has also performed his act at The Royal Albert Hall, London Palladium and Wembley Arena.

Magic consultant
As a magic consultant and illusionist, Hart has written and created magic tricks and special effects for TV, theatre and film. His credits include Trick Artist for Channel 4 starring Benjamin Earl, The Egg Trick starring Ian McKellen, Killer Magic for BBC Three, BBC1's Now You See It, and Not Going Out.

Hart is the co-author of "The Darkest Corners", a specialist book for magicians that explores some of Hart's routines and performance theory.

In the world of theatre, Ben Hart's special effects design credits include: 
Magic Goes Wrong by Mischief Theatre and Penn and Teller 
The Exorcist directed by Sean Mathias,
I and You directed by Edward Hall,
A Christmas Carol (2017) adapted by David Edgar for the Royal Shakespeare Company,
Fanny and Alexander by Stephen Beresford at The Old Vic,
Dracula by The Touring Consortium
Woyzeck (2017) adapted by Jack Thorne and starring John Boyega for The Old Vic,
WILD (2016) by Mike Bartlett at the Hampstead Theatre,
Wonderland by Gyles Brandreth (a musical about the life of Lewis Carroll)
Out of My Head (2013) by Paul Merton,
The Arthur Conan Doyle Appreciation Society by Steven Canny and John Nicholson for Traverse Theatre
Darker Shores at The Hampstead Theatre.

Awards and accolades
The Magic Circle's Young Magician of the Year in 2007
The Magic Circle's Irving Schneider Award Scholarship
The Magic Circle's Marvin Rising Star 2018 awarded by Marvin Berglas
National Reality Television Awards "Best Non-Competitive Reality Format" for Killer Magic
Time Out and Soho Theatre TO&ST cabaret Award nominee 2013

References

External links
  Interview with Ben Hart 
  Exorcist Interview of Illusionist Ben Hart
  BBG Presents: Ben Hart
  Killer Magic with Ben Hart
EBSCOhost Connection 

British magicians
1990 births
Living people
People from Winchester
People educated at Peter Symonds College
British television actors
British theatre people
Britain's Got Talent contestants